Established in 1970, Manukau Institute of Technology (MIT) is a large Category One institute of technology in Auckland, New Zealand.

Category One is the highest possible educational rating as evaluated by the New Zealand Qualifications Authority (NZQA).

MIT is one of the largest providers of technical, vocational and professional education in New Zealand and has over 14,000 enrolled students. On 1 April 2020, Manukau Institute of Technology was subsumed into New Zealand Institute of Skills & Technology alongside the 15 other Institutes of Technology and Polytechnics (ITPs).

Campuses
Campuses across Auckland:
MIT Ōtara – (Ōtara) – the main campus
MIT Manukau (Manukau)
MIT Tech Park (Manukau)
MIT City Campus – (Auckland CBD) – School of Maritime
MIT Kolmar – (Papatoetoe)

References

External links

Manukau Institute of Technology website
New Zealand Qualifications Authority
Tertiary Education Union

Education in Auckland
Te Pūkenga – New Zealand Institute of Skills and Technology
Educational institutions established in 1970
1970 establishments in New Zealand
Ōtara-Papatoetoe Local Board Area